A ruderal species is a plant species that is first to colonize disturbed lands. The disturbance may be natural for example, wildfires or avalanchesor the consequences of human activities, such as construction (of roads, of buildings, mining, etc.) or agriculture (abandoned fields, irrigation, etc.).

The term ruderal originates from the Latin word rudus, meaning "rubble".

Ruderal species typically dominate the disturbed area for a few years, gradually losing the competition to other native species. However, in extreme disturbance circumstances, such as when the natural topsoil is covered with a foreign substance, a single-species ruderal community may become permanently established. In addition, some ruderal invasive species may have such a competitive advantage over the native species that they, too, may permanently prevent a disturbed area from returning to its original state despite natural topsoil.

Features 

Features contributing to a species' success as ruderal are:
 Massive seed production
 Seedlings whose nutritional requirements are modest
 Fast-growing roots
 Independence of mycorrhizae
 Polyploidy

Quantification

Ecologists have proposed various scales for quantifying ruderality, which can be defined as the "ability to thrive where there is disturbance through partial or total destruction of plant biomass" (Grime, Hodgson & Hunt, 1988). The ruderality scale of Grime presents values that are readily available, and it takes into account disturbance factors as well as other indicators such as the annual or perennial character of the plants.

See also 

 Edge effect
 Hemeroby
 Pioneer species
 Restoration ecology
 Supertramp (ecology)
 Examples of  ruderal species:
 Cannabis ruderalis (family Cannabaceae)
 Conyza bonariensis (family Asteraceae)
 Dittrichia viscosa (Asteraceae)
 Nicotiana glauca (Solanaceae)

References

External links

St. John TV. 1987. SOIL DISTURBANCE AND THE MINERAL NUTRITION OF NATIVE PLANTS in Proceedings of the 2nd Native Plant Revegetation Symposium 
Chapin. FS. III. 1980. The mineral nutrition of wild plants. Annu. Rev. Ecol. Syst., 11:233-260.

 
Ecology terminology
Habitat
Botany